Wolves of the Street  (also known as The Wolves of Wall Street or Wolves in Wall Street) is a 1920 American silent Western drama film directed by Otis B. Thayer and starring Edmund Cobb and Vida Johnson. The film was shot in Steamboat Springs, Colorado by the Thayer's Art-O-Graf film company. Franklyn Farnum was originally cast for the lead role, but he did not appear in the completed film.

Plot
James Trevlyn's father, who is battling profiteers working to corner the wheat market, is murdered. James leaves his mine work out west to pick up where his father left off on wall Street. The profiteers foment a Bolshevist strike at Trevlyn's mines in his absence. Eleanor locates a James Trevlyn look-alike at a mission house who takes his place on Wall Street to allow the real James to travel back west to take control of the mines. James is kidnapped and his look-alike is bribed and changes sides. James is mistaken for a wanted murderer and has to re-establish his identity.

Cast
 Edmund Cobb as James Trevlyn / Denver Devers (as Edmund F. Cobb)
 Vida Johnson as Eleanor Fernwood
 Gretchen Wood
 Zelma Edwards 
 Frank Gallager
 A. E. McCormick
 Dave Campbell
 Babe Courvoisier
 Fred Shafer
 Lewis Milner
 Tom Gibson as an extra
 unknown as Mammy Chloe

Crew
 Otis B. Thayer Managing Director
 Vernon L. Walker Head Cameraman
 H. Haller Murphy Cameraman

References

External links

 

1920 films
American black-and-white films
1920s English-language films
Films directed by Otis B. Thayer
1920 Western (genre) films
Arrow Film Corporation films
Silent American Western (genre) films
Films shot in Colorado
1920s American films
Silent American drama films